Moraea garipensis is a species of plant in the family Iridaceae. It is endemic to Namibia.  Its natural habitats are subtropical or tropical dry shrubland and rocky areas. It is threatened by habitat loss.

References

Flora of Namibia
garipensis
Least concern plants
Taxonomy articles created by Polbot